Babel is an open source middleware system serving the scientific computing community. As a language interoperability tool, Babel enables the arbitrary mixing of software libraries written in C/C++, Fortran, Python, and Java. As a distributed computing platform, Babel provides a language-neutral Remote Method Invocation (RMI) scheme similar to Java's RMI which allows third-party plug-ins to specify custom data encodings and network protocols.

How it works

Babel requires developers to use an interface description language to specify  the platform and language neutral interface to code.  Babel uses a custom dialect called SIDL (Scientific Interface Definition Language), which has adaptations specific to computational science and engineering applications. The Babel tool parses the SIDL specification to generate source code which provides the glue between programming languages.

Babel works on all known POSIX and Unix variants, including Linux, Mac OS X, AIX, IRIX, Solaris, Tru64, Cray's XT4, IBM's Blue Gene, and many commodity clusters.  Babel does not require special compiler or linker technology and works with GNU, Intel, IBM, PathScale, PGI, and many other compilers.   Babel is distributed under an LGPL license.

Impact

Babel won an R&D 100 Award in 2006.

It has been used in diverse computational applications such as accelerator beam dynamics, cell biology, chemistry, climate, electron effects, fusion, geomagnetics, materials, nuclear power plants, radio astronomy, and subsurface transport as well as infrastructure such as frameworks, meshing, solvers, sparse linear algebra, and sourcecode refactoring. 
Babel is also redistributed with some customer applications, the CCA framework, and Debian Linux.

History

Babel was started as an internal research project on software components at Lawrence Livermore National Laboratory in 1999. The first public (alpha) release of Babel was in 2001. Also in 2001 it secured funding from SciDAC (Scientific Discovery Through Advanced Computing) along with its collaborators in the   CCA Forum (Common Component Architecture Forum).

Community

Babel development and maintenance is currently funded by United States Department of Energy, but relies heavily on an open source community.  Contributors hail from Sandia National Laboratories, Argonne National Laboratory, Oak Ridge National Laboratory, Tech-X Corp, MIT, University of Utah, and more.  The Babel development team maintain open software repositories, mailing lists, and issue trackers.

See also
CORBA
COM
SWIG
Enduro/X

References

External links
Babel home page
CCA Forum home page
SciDAC home page

Programming tools
Free computer programming tools
Scripting languages